Persona Non Grata is a 2003 documentary film directed by Oliver Stone for the HBO series America Undercover about the Israeli–Palestinian conflict. It is a highly personal journey in occupied Palestinian territories, including interviews of Palestinian President Yasser Arafat, Israeli Prime Ministers Ehud Barak and Benjamin Netanyahu, but also of Hamas and Al-Aqsa Martyrs Brigades militants.

The film was presented as a special event in the New Territories section of the 60th Venice International Film Festival.

References

External links

2003 television films
2003 films
Films directed by Oliver Stone
American documentary films
Documentary films about the Israeli–Palestinian conflict
Yasser Arafat
Wild Bunch (company) films
2000s English-language films
2000s American films